Manning Galloway (born April 27, 1960) is the former WBO welterweight champion of the world.

Galloway's greatest fights were against Gert Bo Jacobsen which were all fought in Randers Hallen, Randers, Denmark. The first fight Manning beat Jacobsen, Jacobsen lost due to a corner retirement. The second fight was a no contest. Jacobsen finally got the best of Galloway in the 3rd fight by decision. From 1990 to 1993 Manning Galloway defended the WBO welterweight title eight times ultimately losing it to Gert Bo Jacobsen.

Galloway has also won the USBA welterweight title, WBO interim welterweight title, and the Ohio State Light Middleweight Title.

See also
 List of welterweight boxing champions

External links
 http://www.cyberboxingzone.com/news/archives/00000244.htm
 https://web.archive.org/web/20070516103336/http://www.thesweetscience.com/boxing-article/2763/manning-galloway-boxing-odyssey/
 http://www.boxrec.com/list_bouts.php?human_id=006085&cat=boxer

1960 births
Living people
Boxers from Columbus, Ohio
Welterweight boxers
World Boxing Organization champions
American male boxers